The  International Academy of Aquatic Art  (or IAAA) is a nonprofit organization for the development of swimming as a performing art. It is based in the United States.

History
The IAAA was founded in 1955 by former synchronized swimmers from the US in order to develop swimming as artistic, creative and non-competitive activity. The incorporators were:
Mary Derosier: former national chairman of the Amateur Athletic Union, which was one of the first organizations who invented synchronized swimming competitions
Richard J. Dodson: in 1951 publisher of the first magazine for synchronized swimming, the Synchronized Swimmer
Henry Gundling: synchronized swimming coach, manager and husband of synchronized swimmer Beulah Gundling

The IAAA regularly organizes festivals throughout the United States and Canada presenting different swimming performances with choreographies for soloists, duets and groups. The IAAA swimmers are called aquatic artists. The style of the performances, which are shown by women and men as well, is a mixture of synchronized swimming, water ballet, ornamental, rhythmic and scientific swimming. In most cases the swimmers use different forms of art music for the programs presented at the IAAA festivals. Bert Hubbard, one of the first male synchronized swimmers from the US, is a board member of the IAAA and documents its history and artistic activities.

Gallery

Further reading
Robert E. Kerper: Splash - Aquatic Shows from A to Z (published by Michael Zielinsky, 2002)
Dawn Pawson Bean: Synchronized swimming - An American history. McFarland Company Inc. Publishers, Jefferson (North Carolina, USA), 2005.
Johanna Beisteiner: Art music in figure skating, synchronized swimming and rhythmic gymnastics/Kunstmusik in Eiskunstlauf, Synchronschwimmen und rhythmischer Gymnastik. PhD thesis, Vienna 2005, (German). Contains information about the International Academy of Aquatic Art (Chapter I/2: History of synchronized swimming, pages 40–55).

References

External links
Official website of the International Academy of Aquatic Art
Official ISHOF website (International Swimming Hall of Fame)

Non-profit organizations based in the United States
Arts organizations established in 1955
Synchronized swimming
1955 establishments in the United States